Boxballet is a 2021 Russian animated film directed by Anton Dyakov.

Plot 
The film contrasts between form and content between a ballerina and a boxer, shows how one affects the other, and makes an attempt to reveal the key philosophical problem, to be and to seen.

Accolades

References

External links 
 
 Official trailer
 Teaser on Vimeo

2021 films
Melnitsa Animation Studio animated films
2020s animated short films
Russian animated short films
Russian boxing films
Ballet films